Le Fœil ( or) is a commune in the Côtes-d'Armor department of Brittany in northwestern France.

Population

Inhabitants of Le Fœil are called fœillais in French.

See also
Communes of the Côtes-d'Armor department

References

External links

Communes of Côtes-d'Armor